Pat Mehaffy (October 8, 1904 – January 31, 1981) was a United States circuit judge of the United States Court of Appeals for the Eighth Circuit.

Education and career

Born in Little Rock, Arkansas, Mehaffy received a Bachelor of Laws from the University of Arkansas School of Law in 1927. He was in private practice in Little Rock from 1929 to 1930. He was an assistant state attorney general of Arkansas from 1929 to 1933. He was chief deputy prosecuting attorney of Pulaski County, Arkansas from 1934 to 1938. He was prosecuting attorney of Pulaski County from 1939 to 1940. He was in private practice in Little Rock from 1940 to 1963.

Federal judicial service

Mehaffy was nominated by President John F. Kennedy on June 24, 1963, to a seat on the United States Court of Appeals for the Eighth Circuit vacated by Judge Joseph William Woodrough. He was confirmed by the United States Senate on July 15, 1963, and received his commission on July 16, 1963. He served as Chief Judge from 1973 to 1974. He assumed senior status due to a certified disability on August 31, 1974. Mehaffy served in that capacity until his death on January 31, 1981, in Little Rock.

References

Sources
 

1904 births
1981 deaths
Judges of the United States Court of Appeals for the Eighth Circuit
United States court of appeals judges appointed by John F. Kennedy
20th-century American judges
University of Arkansas School of Law alumni